Andrej Martin and Hans Podlipnik Castillo were the defending champions but chose not to defend their title.

Jesper de Jong and Vitaliy Sachko won the title after defeating Vladyslav Manafov and Evgenii Tiurnev 7–6(7–4), 6–1 in the final.

Seeds

Draw

References

External links
 Main draw

Almaty Challenger - Doubles